The Callanetics exercise programme was created by Callan Pinckney in the early 1980s.  It is a system of exercise involving frequent repetition of small muscular movements and squeezes, designed to improve muscle tone. The programme was developed by Pinckney from classical ballet exercises, to help ease a back problem that she was born with.

The theory of callanetics is that the surface muscles of the body are supported by deeper muscles, but popular exercise programmes often exercise only the surface muscles.  According to callanetics, deeper muscles are best exercised using small but precise movements.  Exercising the deeper muscles also leads to improved posture, which may result in the appearance of weight loss even if very little weight was lost.

Pinckney also recommends exercising with clothing that highlights (however of course not to flatter) the body's natural shape, and exercising in bright light, to show up the body's imperfections to the exerciser.

The video version of the exercise routine was released by MCA Home Video in November 1986 at a retail price of $29.95 and was a big hit, selling 1 million copies in the United States by January 1990, one of MCA's biggest sellers at the time.

Official Callanetics books by Callan Pinckney

Official Callanetics videos by Callan Pinckney

Official Callanetics DVDs

References

External links
 Official Callanetics Website
 Official Callanetics Streaming Video Website

Physical exercise
Exercise-related trademarks